Megachile rufiventris is a species of bee in the family Megachilidae. It was described by Félix Édouard Guérin-Méneville in 1834.

References

Rufiventris
Insects described in 1834